= Cooper-MG =

The Cooper-MG is a series of two MG-powered sports cars that were designed, developed and built by Cooper Cars between 1950 and 1953. They were called the Cooper T14 and the Cooper T21, respectively. They actively competed in motor racing between 1950 and 1961. In that period, the MG-powered Coopers scored a total of 23 wins and 82 podium finishes between the two cars, and 2 pole positions. They were both power by the 1,250–1,500 cc (76–92 cu in) MG XPAG engine.
